Šerif Konjević (born 26 April 1958) is a Bosnian pop-folk singer and one of the most prominent from the former Yugoslavia. He is considered an aficionado in his relative genre and often performs across various parts of former Yugoslavia and around the world.

Early life
Šerif Konjević was born in Sanica, a village in the municipality of Ključ, Bosnia and Herzegovina.

Discography
O suze moje (1975)
Šansu mi jednu pruzi (1977)
Novo ime Sarajevske strade (1979)
Zagrli me, zagrli (1979) 
Golubica bijela (1980)
Mi se sada rastajemo (1980)
vrati se pod stari krov (1981)
Bela venčanica (1982)
Kunem se u brata svoga (1983)
Naći ću je po mirisu kose (1984)
Hej kafano ostavljam te (1985)
Potraži me (1985)
Bez tebe ja živet neću(1986)
Lani je bio mraz (1987)
Zbog tebe sam vino pio (1988)
Devojačke suze (1989)
Nikad u proleće (1990)
Neko čudno vreme (1991)
Alipašin izvor (1995)
Ti si tu iz navike (1997)
Znam da idem dalje (1999)
Da se opet rodim (2001)
Kasno će biti kasnije (2002)
Mogu dalje sam (2004)
Znakovi (2007)
Nek' mi oproste (2010)
Ljubavi (2011)

References

Bosniaks of Bosnia and Herzegovina
Bosnia and Herzegovina folk-pop singers
Hayat Production artists
1958 births
Living people